The 1914 Tour de France was the 12th edition of the Tour de France, taking place in 15 stages from 28 June to 26 July. It was won by the Belgian cyclist Philippe Thys.

The day the Tour began, Franz Ferdinand, Archduke of Austria was assassinated in Sarajevo, marking the start of World War I. On 3 August Germany invaded Belgium and declared war on France, making this Tour the last for five years, until 1919. The three men who won the Tour between 1907 and 1910 would die in the war.

Innovations and changes
Not much changed from the 1913 Tour de France, the most important novelty was the introduction of frame numbers.

Philippe Thys, who had won the 1913 Tour de France, was returning in 1914 and considered favourite, together with his teammate Henri Pélissier. Apart from him six other previous Tour de France winners started the race: Louis Trousselier, Lucien Petit-Breton, Octave Lapize, François Faber, Odile Defraye and Gustave Garrigou. Four more cyclists started the race that would later win a Tour de France: Firmin Lambot, Léon Scieur, Henri Pélissier and Lucien Buysse. This number of 11 former or future Tour de France winners on the start line is a record. In addition, Italian champion Costante Girardengo, started the race, but Girardengo was not yet the champion from 1919 on, and was not the team leader.

In 1914, the first cyclists from Australia started the Tour de France, Don Kirkham and Iddo Munro. They also finished the race, in 17th place and 20th place.

The cyclists used whistles, to warn other persons that they were coming (mainly downhill).

Teams

Race overview

Thys was dominant in the entire race. Even though he only won the first stage, he finished in the top five every other stage.
In that first stage, Jean Rossius finished second with the same time. The second stage was won by Rossius, with Thys in the same time. Both had the same time, and the same finishing places, so they were both given the lead in the general classification.

In the third stage, the riders reached the first check point one hour late, after they had taken the wrong route and rode 30 km in the wrong direction. The race was then stopped and restarted from the first check point.

The lead remained shared between Rossius and Thys until after the fifth stage, when Thys got away from Rossius. After that stage, Pélissier was third in the classification with only 5'27" behind.

In the sixth stage, the Pyrenees mountains appeared. The stage was won by Lambot, with Thys only 7 minutes behind. The other competitors did worse, with Pélissier losing over 30 minutes and Rossius over one hour. Thys was firmly in the lead. In that stage, Ali Neffati was hit by a car from the organization, and could not continue. According to the rules, he did not have to finish the stage, and was given a time which allowed him to keep his 42nd place in the overall classification. In the sixth stage, Girardengo crashed again, and retired from the Tour, never to come back.

The weather was hot, and in the eighth stage, the cyclists did not want to race and cycled at a low speed. Tour organiser Henri Desgrange then stopped the race, and organised a sprint tournament, with semifinals and finals, which was won by Octave Lapize. In the ninth stage, former winner Faber was penalised with 90 minutes, because he had been pushed and took drinks from a motor cyclist.

Pélissier, still in second place, had done his best to win back time, but he only managed to win back a few minutes. After the thirteenth stage, he was still 31 minutes and 50 seconds behind.
In the 14th stage to Dunkerque, Thys' bicycle broke. It was not allowed to get help while fixing your bicycle, and in the 1913 Tour de France, Eugene Christophe lost his chances of a victory by repairing his own bicycle. Thys decided to take the risk of a time penalty, and bought a new wheel at a shop. This cost him a 30-minute penalty, which left Thys with only 1:50 ahead of Pélissier. Pélissier did his best to overcome the gap, but Thys followed him. In the stage to Dunkerque, Pélissier claimed spectators prevented him from getting away from Thys. In the end, Thys stayed less than two minutes ahead of Henri Pélissier, and managed to keep that margin until the finish in Paris.

Results
In each stage, all cyclists started together. The cyclist who reached the finish first, was the winner of the stage.
The time that each cyclist required to finish the stage was recorded. For the general classification, these times were added up; the cyclist with the least accumulated time was the race leader.

Stage results

General classification

Other classifications
Camille Botte, ranked 15 in the general classification, became the winner of the "isolés" category. The "isolés" classification was calculated in the same way as the general classification, but only the isolated cyclists (not part of a team) were eligible.

The organising newspaper l'Auto named Firmin Lambot  the meilleur grimpeur. This unofficial title is the precursor to the mountains classification.

Aftermath
One week after the race ended, Germany had declared war on France, starting World War I in France. This made the organization of a big cycling race impossible for the next four years, and the Tour de France would start again in 1919. By that time, Tour de France champions Lucien Petit-Breton, François Faber and Octave Lapize had died in the first world war.
The winner of the 1914 Tour de France, Philippe Thys, would survive the war, and go on for his third victory in 1920. Henri Pélissier, the runner-up, would win the Tour de France in 1923.

Notes

References

Bibliography

External links

 
Tour de France
Tour de France by year
Tour de France
Tour de France
Tour de France